NGC 92 is a highly warped interacting unbarred spiral galaxy in Robert's Quartet; it is interacting with three neighbouring galaxies NGC 87, NGC 88 and NGC 89.

References

External links

 

0092
01388
Phoenix (constellation)
Robert's Quartet
Unbarred spiral galaxies
194-G012
18340930